The Fairland Local School District was formed in 1949 as a consolidation of Proctorville and Rome Rural schools. It serves the village of Proctorville, Rome Township, parts of Union and Windsor Township in Lawrence County, as well as parts of Crown City and Guyan Township in Gallia County, all in Ohio. It consists of four schools; Fairland East Elementary (PreK-2), Fairland West Elementary (3-5), Fairland Middle (6-8), and Fairland High School (9-12). The Fairland Dragon is its mascot.

External links 
 District website

School districts in Ohio
Education in Lawrence County, Ohio
School districts established in 1949